Danny Curzon (born May 19, 1987 in Phoenix, Arizona) is an American retired pair skater who competed with partner Chelsi Guillen.

Programs 
(with Guillen)

Results 
(with Guillen)

References

External links 

 

American male pair skaters
1987 births
Living people
Sportspeople from Phoenix, Arizona